The 2007–08 Metropolitan Bank Twenty20 was a Twenty20 cricket competition held in Zimbabwe from 19 to 21 March 2008. It was won by Easterns, who defeated Westerns in the final by seven runs.

Fixtures and results

Group stage

Final

References

2008 in cricket
2008 in Zimbabwean sport
Zimbabwean domestic cricket competitions
Stanbic Bank 20 Series
Domestic cricket competitions in 2007–08